The Jerusalem Volvo Open is a professional tennis tournament played on hard courts. It is currently part of the ATP Challenger Tour. It is held annually in Jerusalem since 2019.

Past finals

Singles

Doubles

References

ATP Challenger Tour
Hard court tennis tournaments
Sport in Jerusalem
Recurring sporting events established in 2019